Pseudoludia nyungwe is a species of moth in the family Saturniidae. It was described by Thierry Bouyer in 1988. It is found in Rwanda.

References

Moths described in 1988
Saturniinae